The NASCAR Winston Cup Series era was the period of the National Association for Stock Car Auto Racing (NASCAR) from 1971-2003. In 1971, NASCAR leased its naming rights to the R.J. Reynolds Tobacco Company who named the series after its premier brand "Winston". The series was referred to as the NASCAR Winston Cup Series from that point forward. Many view the Winston Cup Series Era as a time in which NASCAR entered the modern era of spectator sports. During this era, NASCAR experienced a significant rise in popularity that persisted until Winston left the sport after the 2003 season.

1971–1979 

In 1971, NASCAR was courting the tobacco giant, R.J. Reynolds Company about sponsoring the entire NASCAR Grand National series. Due to a new congressional mandate, the tobacco companies were no longer able to advertise on television. As a result of the legislation, Reynolds Co. had a massive advertising budget a lot of which went to auto racing starting in 1971. The tobacco company saw a major potential advertising base that could offset the loss of television commercials. The new name of NASCAR's premier stock car racing tour became the "Winston Cup Grand National Series." During the Winston Cup Era, NASCAR experienced a significant rise in national prominence. One example is the 1979 Daytona 500 which was the first race of its kind to be broadcast to a national television audience from start to finish. On the final lap of the 1979 Daytona 500, Donnie Allison and Cale Yarborough crashed allowing Richard Petty to take the victory. After the race, Donnie Allison along with his brother Bobby got into a fight with Yarborough on the backstretch. Millions observed this encounter on live television helping NASCAR enter a niche in spectator sports once held exclusively by other events.

Plymouth's final season was 1977 and American Motors' final season was 1978.

1980–1989 

On July 4, 1984, President Ronald Reagan became the first sitting president to attend a NASCAR race when he watched the "King" Richard Petty win the 1984 Firecracker 400. Some look to moments such as these to suggest that the Winston Cup Era marked the time in which NASCAR officially appeared on the national stage in America. The Firecracker 400 was Petty's 200th and final Winston Cup victory. In that same year, Terry Labonte captured his first Winston Cup Series Championship driving the No. 44 Piedmont Airlines Chevrolet Monte Carlo.

In 1985, R.J. Reynolds Tobacco Company introduced a concept called "The Winston Million." This idea entailed a million-dollar prize to be awarded to any driver that won three out of four major races during the 1985 season. Those races were the Daytona 500, the Winston 500, the World 600, and the Southern 500. Bill Elliott would become the first driver to win "The Winston Million" after he won the Daytona 500, the Winston 500, and the Southern 500 in 1985 in the #9 Coors Ford Thunderbird. This prize would award the winner a check for $200,000. This development set a precedent for significant cash prizes for winners of NASCAR events and funneled an increasing amount of cash flow into the sport. Darrell Waltrip was the first to be awarded "The Winston" at Charlotte Motor Speedway. Waltrip won his first and only Daytona 500 in 1989 driving the #17 Tide Chevrolet Monte Carlo for Hendrick Motorsports. Chrysler and Dodge ceased participation after the 1985 season. Mercury's final season was 1980.

In 1988, amid fears of a hostile takeover within Goodyear, Hoosier Racing Tire entered the Winston Cup Series, sparking the first of two tire wars in the sport. The season saw a war of attrition among teams, as tire failures from both tire manufacturers resulted in horrific crashes and numerous driver injuries. By the end of the season, Hoosier claimed nine victories out of the 28 races. In 1989, after a botched attempt at Daytona, Goodyear officially unveiled their new radial tires at North Wilkesboro Speedway to combat Hoosier's bias-ply tires. After Dale Earnhardt won the race on Goodyears, interest in Hoosier waned until the company left NASCAR after the Winston 500 at Talladega, ending the tire war.

1990–1999 

At the 1990 Daytona 500, Earnhardt led 155 of the 200 laps when he not only ran over a piece of metal on the backstretch but also popped a tire on the final lap. Derrike Cope, driving the No. 10 Purolator Chevy Lumina, was able to pass Earnhardt and win the 32nd annual running of the Daytona 500. During the 1991 Winston Cup season, Harry Gant driver of the #33 Skoal Oldsmobile swept the races at Darlington, Richmond, Dover, and Martinsville going undefeated in the month of September. Gant was nicknamed "Mr. September" for this historic winning streak. A record six drivers were still in contention for the Winston Cup Championship going into the season finale at Atlanta Motor Speedway in 1992. Alan Kulwicki, Bill Elliott, Davey Allison, Harry Gant, Kyle Petty, and Mark Martin were all fighting for the championship during the 1992 Hooters 500. Bill Elliott won the race, but Alan Kulwicki captured the championship by a slim ten-point margin. This race would also be the final Winston Cup race for the "King" Richard Petty ending an era of Petty fandom. General Motors brand Buick left the series after the 1992 season and fellow GM brand Oldsmobile departed after 1994, leaving Chevrolet, Ford and Pontiac as the remaining manufacturers.

Hoosier re-entered the Winston Cup Series in 1994 for its second tire war with Goodyear. Their return was marred by the practice crash deaths of Neil Bonnett and Rodney Orr at Daytona, as both cars were on Hoosiers and the media was quick to blame the tire manufacturer. Despite four wins with Geoff Bodine, Hoosier once again struggled to gain interest from other drivers and left NASCAR for good at the end of the season.

Earnhardt won his seventh and final Winston Cup Championship in 1994 and his long-awaited Daytona 500 victory in 1998, assisting to his rise to national recognition as well as the recognition of the Winston series in general. The "Iceman" Terry Labonte won the Winston Cup Series Championship for the second and final time in 1996 driving for Hendrick Motorsports. Various other racers won the series in the subsequent years prior to the decline of the series after turn of the century.

2000–2003 
Dale Earnhardt Jr., son of the now iconic Dale Earnhardt, took home his first career victory in 2000 at Texas Motor Speedway in the #8 Budweiser Chevrolet Monte Carlo. Joe Gibbs, racing driver Bobby Labonte, captured the 2000 Winston Cup Series Championship in his #18 Interstate Batteries Pontiac Grand Prix.

The Winston Cup Series began to decline in national admiration during a fatal crash during the 2001 Daytona 500. Dale Earnhardt and Sterling Marlin were competing for third place in the 2001 Daytona 500 on the final lap when the crash took place. Earnhardt's car sped up the racetrack into Ken Schrader's M&M's Pontiac, the two cars slammed into the outside wall. Earnhardt's car hit Schrader's head-on. Earnhardt was severely injured in the crash and was later pronounced dead at 5:16 P.M. Michael Waltrip, the driver of the #15 Napa Auto Parts Chevrolet Monte Carlo, won the 2001 Daytona 500. Dale Earnhardt Incorporated driver Steve Park won the race at Rockingham one week after his boss Dale Earnhardt died in the 2001 Daytona 500. Dodge also re-entered the series in 2001 after being absent since 1985.

In 2003, Ricky Craven, driver of the #32 Tide Pontiac Grand Prix, finished .002 seconds ahead of Kurt Busch to win Carolina Dodge Dealers 400. It was the closest recorded finish in NASCAR history (until the 2018 PowerShares QQQ 300, a NASCAR Xfinity Series race where Tyler Reddick edged Elliott Sadler by 0.0004 seconds) and gained national attention. It was also the last win for the Pontiac marque, as General Motors withdrew the brand at the end of the season.

There were fifteen different series champions during the Winston Cup Series era. Seventy different drivers won at least one race during the Winston Cup Era.  The time period encompassed a significant rise in NASCAR viewership while also marking the beginning of a significant decline in NASCAR popularity that would continue over the next decade.

References 

1971 beginnings
2003 endings
Winston Cup Series era
Winston Cup Series era
Winston Cup Series era
Winston Cup Series era
Winston Cup Series era
Winston era
R. J. Reynolds Tobacco Company